Adam Richard (born Adam Richard Dellamarta, 1 January 1971 in Carlton, Victoria) is an Australian comedian, actor, radio presenter, writer and media personality, best known co-writing and starring in Outland, an ABC1 comedy series about a group of LGBT sci-fi geeks. Richard was also a team captain on the 2014 revival of music quiz and live music performance show Spicks and Specks, and a permanent panel member on the Doctor Who-themed 2017 show Whovians.

Career
After a variety of part-time jobs including working as a State Bank teller, a fast-food seller and a cleaner, Richard had his first stand-up gig in 1996. During the late 1990s Richard was a regular on RMITV shows including The Loft Live with Rove McManus, Under Melbourne Tonight, What's Goin' On There? (1998) and Whose Shout (1999).

He had a regular gossip segment on Triple J radio in 2002–2003, where he was known as Mister Bitch. He has presented a similar segment on The Matt and Jo Show on Fox FM since 2003.

On television, he has made regular appearances on Rove Live, 9am with David & Kim and Spicks and Specks. He also appeared on The Glass House. In 2007, he was also a regular on the very short-lived show Celebrity Dog School with his dog, Snoops. He had a guest acting role in 2010 on Sleuth 101, and appeared in Celebrity Splash! in 2013.

He co-wrote and starred in the ABC1 comedy series Outland in 2012.

Richard was one of the team captains in the revival of the ABC television show Spicks and Specks that commenced on 5 February 2014.  In 2017, Richard featured on Whovians, the Australian comedy panel show which focused on the science fiction television series Doctor Who to analyse and critique the program.

Since 2001, Richard has (along with Scott Brennan and Toby Sullivan) been one-third of comedy group Talking Poofy, and their podcast (The Poofcast) has been running since 2010.

Personal life
Richard was born Adam Richard Dellamarta but informally changed his name to Adam Richard when he was a teenager. He officially changed it in 1996 after the death of his mother. He attended Brunswick Primary School and Princes Hill Secondary College in Carlton North, Victoria. He also completed a writing course at RMIT University. Prior to venturing into comedy he had a variety of jobs including being a bank teller. He is openly gay and has been billed as the country's first openly gay comedian. He has also revealed he suffers from debilitating panic attacks but is able to get it under control, with assistance.

References

External links
 Adam Richard website
 Adam Richard Twitter account

1971 births
Living people
Australian radio personalities
Australian stand-up comedians
Australian male comedians
Comedians from Melbourne
RMITV alumni
Australian gay actors
Gay comedians
21st-century LGBT people
People from Carlton, Victoria
Australian LGBT comedians